Warana is a coastal suburb  of  Kawana Waters in the Sunshine Coast Region, Queensland, Australia.

Geography 
Warana is located within the Kawana Waters urban centre.  

The western boundary of Warana follows the Mooloolah River and the middle of Wyuna Canal. 

A coastal reserve, which extends southwards into Bokarina and Wurtulla, has been established along the foreshore preventing beachfront development. The area immediately west of the coastal reserve is residential. In the south-west of the suburb is an industrial estate, the Kawana Sewerage Treatment Plant and an undeveloped marsh area in the far south-west.

History 
The name Warana was proposed by land developer Alfred Grant on  31 March 1960 during negotiations with the Queensland Government to develop the land, an arrangement which was agreed in July 1960. Grant claimed that the name Warana meant blue skies in a Tasmanian dialect.

Education 
There are no schools in Warana. The nearest primary schools are Buddina State School in neighbouring Buddina to the north and Kawana Waters State College in neighbouring Bokarina to the south. The nearest secondary school is Kawana Waters State College.

References

External links
 

Suburbs of the Sunshine Coast Region
Kawana Waters, Queensland
Coastline of Queensland